Kumari Prashnaharu is a Nepali short stories collection by Durga Karki. It was published on February 21, 2020 by Nepa-laya publication. The book is a collection of 13 short stories. The major themes of the stories are social realism and feminism. The stories highlights the social and gender inequality in Nepali society.

Background 
It is the debut book of the writer. The book was launched as a part of 2020 series of Nepalaya publication which featured books of four women writers. The other books are Singha Durbarko Ghumne Mech by Dr. Sudha Sharma, Parityakta by Bhuwan Dhungana and Dumero by Sarala Gautam. The book was launched jointly by Ambassador of Britain to Nepal Nicola Pollitt and journalist Ameet Dhakal in Nepalaya's 'r' shala in Kalikasthan, Kathmandu.

The titles of the thirteen stories included in the collection are:

Reception 
The book received mostly positive receptions from critics. Agyat Luitel of Shilapatra, an online news site, praised the novelty factor of the stories but criticized the cliches plots in some stories. Bishal Babu Basnet of eKagaj online news site praised the literary maturity that the writer achieved in her debut work.

See also 

 Dumero
 Parityakta
 Singha Durbarko Ghumne Mech
 Shirishko Phool

References

External Links 

 Official Page
 Goodreads Page

2020 short story collections
21st-century Nepalese books
21st-century Nepalese literature
Cultural depictions of Nepalese women
Nepalese books
Nepali short story collections
Nepalese short story collections
Nepali-language books